It's Alright with Me is the third studio album by American singer Patti LaBelle, released in 1979 via Epic Records. Produced by Skip Scarborough, the album was a success due to the popularity of the songs "Come What May" and "Music is My Way of Life", the latter finding success on the dance chart.

Critical reception
Rolling Stone wrote that the "sleek arrangements are too tight to allow the aimless vocal overkill that marred so many earlier performances, yet they're flexible enough to avoid formulas." The Bay State Banner thought that "sometimes [Labelle's] shrill yells and cries can wear on the ears, but the bulk of this album presents her most effectively, joining the past cosmic aura of the group Labelle with today's more earthy atmosphere."

Track listing
All tracks produced by Skip Scarborough.

Personnel 
 Patti LaBelle – lead vocals 
 Michael Stanton – acoustic piano (1, 5, 9), Fender Rhodes (2-4, 8), clavinet (9)
 Ernest Straughter – Fender Rhodes (1, 5, 6, 9), acoustic piano (2-4, 8)
 Felton Pilate – synthesizers (6, 9)
 Wayne Vaughn – synthesizers (6)
 Skip Scarborough – acoustic piano (7), Fender Rhodes (7), horn and string arrangements 
 Johnny Graham – guitar (1, 3, 8)
 John Rowin – guitar (1-6, 8, 9)
 Louis Russell – guitar (2), acoustic guitar (7)
 Spencer Bean – guitar (4, 6, 9)
 Wayne Douglas – bass (1, 3, 4, 7, 8)
 Robert Russell – bass (2, 6, 9)
 Nate Neblett – drums
 Miguel Fuentes – glockenspiel (1, 3, 4, 8), triangle (1, 8), xylophone (1, 3, 8), percussion (2, 7), vibraphone (5)
 Munyungo Jackson – percussion (1-6, 8, 9)
 David Crawford – orchestra arrangements and conductor 
 George Bohanon – horn contractor 
 Charles Veal – string contractor 
 Emma Coleman – additional backing vocals (1)
 The Waters [Julia, Luther, Maxine and Oren Waters] – backing vocals (1, 2, 4, 5, 7-9)
 Scherrie Payne – backing vocals (3, 6)
 The Wright Combination [Dianne and Michael Wright] – backing vocals (3, 6)

Production 
 James Budd Ellison – assistant producer 
 Don Cody – recording, mixing 
 Steve MacMillan – assistant engineer 
 Jerry Williamson – assistant engineer 
 Steve Mantoani – technical advisor 
 Stacy Baird – technical assistant 
 Ben O'Brien – technical assistant 
 Stuart J. Romaine – mastering 
 Sigidi Abdullah – music copyist 
 Yvonne Brooks – production coordinator 
 Janet Perr – art direction, design 
 Paula Scher – art direction, design 
 Bill King – photography
 Mixed at Different Fur Studios (San Francisco, California).
 Mastered at CBS Studios (New York City, New York).

Charts

References

Album chart usages for Billboard200
Album chart usages for BillboardRandBHipHop
1979 albums
Patti LaBelle albums
Epic Records albums
Albums recorded at Total Experience Recording Studios